Keziah or Kezia is a Hebrew name. Keziah was a daughter of Job in the Hebrew Bible. The name Keziah means "restored to the heart of God" and references Job's restoration after the trials he faced in the first part of his life. 

In the United Kingdom, the name Keziah is now unusual, but it was more common in Victorian times.  In 1890, the births of 137 children named Kezia were registered in England; in 1990, only 40 were. More recently the name has become unisex despite its origin such as the musician Keziah Jones. Keziah has also found  its way into modern literature in the book Keziah Dane by Sue Grafton.

Keziah was also used as a female first name in the United States in the nineteenth century. For example, Keziah Brevard ran a plantation in South Carolina in the 1850s and 60s; Keziah Brower lived on farms near Madison, Wisconsin and Vermillion, Dakota Territory (now South Dakota) in the 1850s, 60s, and 70s. H. P. Lovecraft's The Dreams in the Witch House feature a character named Keziah Mason.

The modern name Keisha is derived from this name.

References

Hebrew-language names